The Coca-Cola Company has used various advertising slogans since its inception in 1886.

United States (also Canada, UK, and Ireland)
(Slogans used by Coca-Cola in the United States are typically also the ones used in Canada, Ireland, and the United Kingdom.)
 1886 – Drink Coca-Cola
 1905 – Coca-Cola revives and sustains.
 1906 – The Great National Temperance Beverage.
 1908 – Good til the last drop.
 1910 – Whenever you see an Arrow think of Coca-Cola
 1917 – Three million a day.
 1922 – Thirst knows no season.
 1923 – Enjoy thirst.
 1924 – Refresh yourself.
 1925 – Six million a day.
 1926 – It had to be good to get where it is.
 1927 – Pure as Sunlight.
 1927 – Around the corner from anywhere.
 1928 – Coca-Cola ... pure drink of natural flavors.
 1929 – The pause that refreshes.
 1932 – Ice-cold sunshine.
 1938 – The best friend thirst ever had.
 1938 – Thirst asks nothing more.
 1939 – Coca-Cola goes along.
 1939 – Whoever You Are, Whatever You Do, Wherever You May Be, When You Think of Refreshment Think of Ice Cold Coca-Cola
 1942 – The only thing like Coca-Cola is Coca-Cola itself.
 1945 – Passport to refreshment.
 1947 – Coke knows no season.
 1948 – Where There's Coke There's Hospitality.
 1949 – Along the Highway to Anywhere.
 1952 – What you want is a Coke.
 1954 – For people on the go.
 1956 – Coca-Cola... makes good things taste better.
 1957 – Sign of good taste.
 1958 – The Cold, Crisp Taste of Coke.
 1959 – Be Really Refreshed.
 1963 – Things go better with Coke.
 1969 – It's the Real Thing. (see also "I'd Like to Buy the World a Coke")
 1975 – Look up, America.
 1976 – Coke adds life.
 1979 – Have a Coke and a smile (see also "Hey Kid, Catch!")
 1980 – Coke is it!
 1985 – America's real choice
 1985 – We've Got a Taste for You
 1986 – Red, White & You (for Coca-Cola Classic)
 1986 – Catch the Wave (for New Coke)
 1987 – When Coca-Cola is a Part of Your Life, You Can't Beat the Feeling
 1988 – Can't Beat the Feeling
 1989 – Official Soft Drink of Summer
 1990 – Can't Beat The Real Thing.
 1993 – Always Coca-Cola.
 1995 – Always and Only Coca-Cola (test marketed, secondary radio jingle).
 1998 – Born to be red. (US)
 1998 – Coca-Cola always the real thing! (UK)
 1999 – Coca-Cola. Enjoy.
 2001 – Life tastes good.
 2003 – Real.
 2005 – Make It Real.
 2006 – The Coke side of life
 2009 – Open Happiness
 2016 – Taste the Feeling
 2020 – Turn Up Your Rhythm
 2020 – Together Tastes Better
 2021 – Real Magic

Australia/New Zealand
(Coca-Cola has been in Australia since 1938, and around the same time for New Zealand.)
 1961 – "Be refreshed"
 1964 – "Things go better with Coke"
 1972 – "It's the real thing"
 1977 – "Coke adds life"
 1980 – "Smile"
 1982 – "Coke is it!"
 1989 – "You Can't Beat the Feeling"
 1993 – "Always Coca-Cola"
 2000 – "Enjoy"
 2001 – "Life tastes good"
 2004 – "Real"
 2005 – "As it should be"
 2007 – "The Coke side of life"
 2008 – "Real taste. Uplifting refreshment"
 2010 – "Open Happiness"
 2011 – "Share A Coke"
 2013 – "Real Taste. Uplifting Refreshment"
 2016 – "Taste The Feeling"
 2020 – "Together Tastes Better"
 2021 – "Real Magic"

Spain
 1929 –  ('The Pause That Refreshes')
 1959 –  ('Coca-Cola Refreshes You Best')
 1963 –  ('Things Go Better With Coke')
 1970 –  ('It's The Real Thing')
 1976 –  ('Coke gives more life')
 1982 –  ('Coke is it')
 1987 –  ('You Can't Beat the Feeling')
 1993 –  ('Always Coca-Cola')
 2000 –  ('Live It')
 2001 –  ('Life Tastes Good')
 2003 –  ('Coca-Cola, Real')
 2006 –  ('The Coke Side of Life')
 2008 –  ('Spreading Happiness since 1886')
 2008 –  ('The Coke Side of Life')
 2009 –  ('Open Happiness')
 2016 –  ('Taste the Feeling')
 2021 – "Real Magic"

Latín America
 1929 –  ('The Pause That Refreshes')
 1959 –  ('Coca-Cola Refreshes You Best')
 1963 –  ('Things Go Better With Coke')
 1970 –  ('It's The Real Thing')
 1976 –  ('Coke gives more life')
 1979 –  ('Coke and a Smile')
 1982 –  ('Coke is it')
 1987 –  /  (Mexico) ('You Can't Beat the Feeling')
 1993 –  ('Always Coca-Cola')
 2000 –  ('Live It')
 2001 –  ('Life Tastes Good')
 2003 –  ('Coca-Cola, Real')
 2006 –  ('The Coke Side of Life')
 2008 –  ('Spreading Happiness since 1886')
 2008 –  ('The Coke Side of Life')
 2009 –  ('Open Happiness')
 2016 –  ('Taste the Feeling')
 2021 –  ('Real Magic')

Hungary
 1989 –  ("You Can't Beat the Feeling")
 1993 –  ("Always Coca-Cola")
 2000 –  ("Coca-Cola. Enjoy")
 2001 –  ("Living is good")
 2006 –  ("The Coke Side of Life")
 2009 –  ("Open Happiness")
 2016 –  ("Taste the Feeling")
 2021 – "Real Magic"

India
(In Hindi)
 "Always the Real Thing!"
  (Thanda matlab Coca-Cola!, 'Cold means Coca-Cola!')
  (Pī'ō sar uṭhā kē, 'Drink with pride')
  (Jo Chaho ho jaye, Coca-Cola enjoy!, 'Whatever you wish will come true, enjoy Coca-Cola!')
 "Open Happiness"
  ('Coke opens, the conversation starts')
 "Taste The Feeling"
 
 "Say it with Coke"
 "Real Magic"

Indonesia / Malaysia
 1970 – Minumlah Coca-Cola ('Drink Coca-Cola')
 1982 – Coca-Cola Tentu! ('Coke is it!', 'Coca-Cola is it!')
 1993 – "Always Coca-Cola"
 2000 – Semangat Coca-Cola ('Coca-Cola Enjoy')
 2001 – Rasakan Semangat Hidup ('Life Tastes Good')
 2003 – Segarkan Harimu ('Refresh Your Day')
 2004 – Segarnya Mantap ('Feel Refreshed')
 2006 – Rasakan Hidup ala Coca-Cola ('Feel Alive on The Coke Side of Life')
 2007 – Hidup ala Coca-Cola ('Live on The Coke Side of Life')
 2008 – Brrr... Hidup ala Coca-Cola ('Brrr... Live on The Coke Side of Life')
 2008 – "Coca-Cola Zero no sugar" ('Great Taste, Zero Sugar') (for Coca-Cola Zero)
 2009 – Buka Coca-Cola, Buka Semangat Baru ('Open Coca-Cola, Open Happiness')
 2009 – Buka Semangat Baru ('Open Happiness')
 2010 – Segarkan Semangatmu ('Refresh Your Spirit')
 2013–2017 – Buka Semangat ('Open Happiness')
 2015 – Nikmati Coca-Cola Bersama ('Share A Coke')
 2015 – Nikmati Segarnya Coca-Cola Bersama ('Share A Coke')
 2016 – Rasakan Momennya ('Feel The Moment')
 2017 – Coca-Cola Brrr... Rasakan Momennya ('Coca-Cola Brrr... Feel The Moment')
 2017 – Buka Momennya ('Open The Moment')
 2017 – Rasai Semangatnya
 2020 – Hidupkan Semangatmu ('Live on Your Spirit')
 2020 – Hidupkan Rentakmu  ('Live Your Beat')
 2020 – Bersama Berasa Lebih ('Together Tastes Better')
 2021 – Rasakan Keajaiban ('Real Magic' or 'Feel The Magic')

Israel 
 1989 -  (You Can't Beat the Feeling)
 1994 -  (Always Coca-Cola)
 2007 –  ('Love the Life')
 2016 –  ('The Taste of Life')
 2021 – "Real Magic"

Italy 
 1959 – Il miglior Ristoro (Coca-Cola refreshes you best)
 1963 – Tutto è meglio con Coca Cola (Everything is better with Coke)
 1963 – Tutto va meglio con Coca Cola (Things go better with Coke)
 1969 – Coca Cola da più vita (The Real Thing)
 1982 – Coca-Cola di più (Coke is it)
 1987 – Sensazione unica (You can't beat the feeling)
 1993 – Sempre Coca-Cola (Always Coca-Cola)
 1999 – Enjoy
 2001 – Life tastes good
 2006 – Taste the coke side of life
 2007 – Make every drop count
 2008 – Vivi il lato Coca Cola della vita (Long live the Coca-Cola side of life)
 2009 – Stappa la felicità (Open Happiness)
 2009 – Vivi la musica e accendi l'estate (Experience music and light up the summer)
 2010 – Buon appetito con Coca-Cola (Enjoy your meal with Coca-Cola)
 2011 – Open Happiness
 2013 – Stappa la felicità (Open Happiness)
 2016 – Taste The Feeling
 2021 – "Real Magic"

Japan
 1962 –  ('Sparkling and refreshing Coca-Cola')
 1976 – Come on in. (Drink) Coke.
 1980 – Yes Coke Yes
 1985 – Coke is it.
 1987 – I feel Coke.
 1991 –  ('A moment that refreshes')
 1993 – Always Coca-Cola
 2000 – Enjoy
 2001 – No Reason
 2004 – Special Magic
 2007 – The Coke Side of Life
 2010 – Open Happiness
 2012 – Refreshing & Uplifting
 2016 – Taste The Feeling
 2021 – "Real Magic"

Pakistan
  ('Only Coca Cola makes everyone happy')
  ('Open Happiness')
  ('Eat Drink Live')
  ('Come Eat Together')
  ('Drink in Excitement')
  ('Fun of every Moment')
  ('O Tyrant! Feed me Coca-Cola')
 2017 –  ('Taste The Feeling')
 2021 – "Real Magic"

Philippines
 1912 – Drink Coca Cola
 1923 – Enjoy Life
 1954 – Ice Cold Coca Cola
 1971 – I'd Like To Buy The World A Coke
 1976 – Coke Adds Life
 1982 – Coke Is It!
 1988 – Can't Beat The Feeling
 1991 – Coca Cola Is It!
 1994 – Always Coca-Cola
 1998 – Nothing refreshes like the real thing.
 2000 – Enjoy Coca Cola
 2001 – Buti na lang, nag Coca-Cola ka muna.
 2003 – 
 2005 – 
 2006 – 
 2008 – "Great Taste, Zero Sugar" (for Coca-Cola Zero)
 2009 – 
 2010 – Open Happiness
 2011 – 
 2012 – 
 2013 – 
 2013 (Christmas) – Coke With Names!
 2014 – Breaktime is Coca-Cola Time
 2014 – 
 2015 – 
 2015 (Christmas) – 
 2016 – Taste The Feeling
 2020 – Together Tastes Better
 2021 - Real Magic

Poland
 1971 – ". ('Coca-Cola refreshes')
 1982 –  – Agnieszka Osiecka ('Coke is it!')
 1993 –  ('Always Coca-Cola')
 2000 –  ('Coca-Cola: such a joy') — part of international "Enjoy!" branding; created by professor Jerzy Bralczyk, authority in linguistics.
 2007 –  ('Welcome to the Coke side of life')
 2011–2017 –  ('Open Happiness')
 2017 –  ('Taste The Feeling')
 2021 – Prawdziwa Magia ('Real Magic')

Russia
 1993 –  ('Always Coca-Cola')
 2010 – " ('Coca-Cola is going to the house!')
 2011–2015 – " ('Open Happiness')
 "
 2016 –  ('Taste The Feeling')
 2021 –  ('Magic Moments')

Czech Republic
 1982? –  ("This is it!")
 1990 –  ("The Real Thing!")
 1994 –  ("Always Coca-Cola")
 1994 (Special) –  ("All of them are Yo-yo")
 1995 –  ("Refreshment you have yet to experience!") (for Coca-Cola Light)
 1996 (Special) –  ("World partner of the Olympics")
 1996 –  ("Live differently!") (for Coca-Cola Cherry)
 1996 (Christmas) –  ("Coca-Cola, the real Christmas refreshment")
 1997 (Special) –  ("Coca-Cola Is Good With Food")
 1997 –  "(Surprise under every cap")
 1997 (Christmas) –  ("The real Christmas refreshment")
 1998 –  ("Quenches thirst, refreshes mind")
 1998 –  ("Just for the feeling") (for Coca-Cola Light)
 1999 (Special) –  ("Refresh yourself and win!")
 200x –  ("Real taste. Zero sugar") (for Coca-Cola Zero)
 2000–2002 –  ("Enjoy!")
 2001 (Christmas) –  ("Enjoy the real Christmas refreshment")
 2002 –  ("A taste the whole world loves")
 2002–2003 (Special) –  ("Refresh yourself in one shot")
 2003 –  ("Chihuahua! Together on one wave!")
 2003 (Christmas) –  ("The real Christmas refreshment")
 2004 –  ("Always Refreshes")
 2006 –  ("Enjoy life with happiness")
 2006 –  ("Irresistible taste") (for Coca-Cola Light)
 2007 (Christmas) –  ("Pass On The Christmas Spirit")
 2008 (Christmas) –  ("Christmas with taste")
 2009 –  ("Open joy")
 2012 –  ("Real taste. Zero sugar. Possible?") (for Coca-Cola Zero)
 2016 – "Taste the Feeling"
 2021 – "Real Magic"

References

External links

 Official Coca-Cola website
 The Coca-Cola Company

Lists of advertising slogans
Promotional campaigns by Coca-Cola
American advertising slogans